Jesty is a surname. Notable people with the surname include:

 Benjamin Jesty (1736–1816), farmer who experimented with cowpox to immunise against smallpox
Chris Jesty (born 1942/43), British writer and cartographer
 Trevor Jesty (born 1948), cricketer
 Thomas Jesty (born 1991), chorister